Morocco (MAR) competed at the 2005 Mediterranean Games in Almería, Spain. The nation had a total number of 142 participants (110 men and 32 women).

Medals

Gold
 Athletics
Men's 10.000 metres: Mohammed Amyn
Men's 3000m Steeplechase: Brahim Boulami
Women's Half Marathon: Zhor El Kamch

Silver
 Athletics
Men's 1.500 metres: Adil Kaouch
Men's 5.000 metres: Hicham Bellani
Men's Triple Jump: Tarik Bouguetaïb
Men's Half Marathon: Abdelkebir Lamachi
Women's 5.000 metres: Asmae Leghzaoui
Women's 10.000 metres: Asmae Leghzaoui

Bronze
 Athletics
Men's 800 metres: Amine Laalou

 Boxing
Men's Featherweight (– 57 kg): Aboubakr Seddik Lbida

 Judo
Men's Half-Middleweight (– 81 kg): Safouane Attaf

See also
 Morocco at the 2004 Summer Olympics
 Morocco at the 2008 Summer Olympics

External links
 

Nations at the 2005 Mediterranean Games
2005
Mediterranean Games